Yessenia Coely Zelaya Galeas (born 24 November 1974 in Choluteca, Choluteca) is a Honduran politician. She currently serves as deputy of the National Congress of Honduras representing the National Party of Honduras for Choluteca.

In 2012 she participated for the primary elections to become Mayor of Choluteca.

References

1974 births
Living people
People from Choluteca Department
Deputies of the National Congress of Honduras
National Party of Honduras politicians
21st-century Honduran women politicians
21st-century Honduran politicians